The Helmer-Winnett-White Flats is a historic two-story row house in Lincoln, Nebraska. It was built in 1898 on land owned by William T. White for Louis Helmer, who served as a member of the Nebraska House of Representatives, and H. J. Winnett, who served as the mayor of Lincoln in 1899. It was designed in the Eclectic style, with "decorative brickwork in parapet with scrolled terra-cotta coping." It has been listed on the National Register of Historic Places since October 1, 1979.

References

Apartment buildings in Nebraska
National Register of Historic Places in Lancaster County, Nebraska
Residential buildings completed in 1898